Garry Clively (born 24 July 1955) is a former Australian racing cyclist. He won the Australian national road race title in 1989  and finished 7th in the 1977 Vuelta a España.

Major results
1975 
 8th Coppa Ugo Agostoni
1976
 2nd Gran Premio Città di Camaiore
 7th Trofeo Laigueglia
 7th Trofeo Pantalica
 8th Overall Setmana Catalana de Ciclisme
1977
 7th Overall Vuelta a España
1989
 1st  Road race, National Road Championships

Grand Tour general classification results timeline

References

External links
 

1955 births
Living people
Australian male cyclists
Cyclists from Brisbane